Asaia siamensis is a species of acetic acid bacterium. It was first isolated from a flower of Calotropis gigantea collected in Bangkok. Its type strain is NRIC 0323T (= JCM 10715T = IFO 16457T).

References

Further reading

Sjamsuridzal, Wellyzar. Forkomikro Catalogue of Cultures of Indonesian Microorganisms. Yayasan Obor Indonesia, 2008. 

Horsakova, I., et al. "Asaia sp. as a bacterium decaying the packaged still fruit beverages." Czech. J. Food Sci 27 (2009): 362–365.

External links

LPSN
Type strain of Asaia siamensis at BacDive -  the Bacterial Diversity Metadatabase

Rhodospirillales
Bacteria described in 2001